Harry W. Bolens was a member of the Wisconsin State Senate.

Biography
Bolens was born Harry Wilbur Bolens in Washington, Iowa, in 1864. He moved with his family to Wisconsin in 1866, settling in Janesville, Wisconsin. Later, they moved to Port Washington, Wisconsin. in 1879, Bolens served in the United States Army during the Spanish–American War. Bolens died on October 24, 1944 at his home.  His former home, now known as the Harry W. Bolens House, is listed on the National Register of Historic Places.

Career
Bolens was Mayor of Port Washington from 1906 to 1908 and again from 1910 to 1914. He also served on the Port Washington Common Council and on the Ozaukee County Board of Supervisors and was chairman of the county board In 1920, Bolens was a candidate for the United States House of Representatives from Wisconsin's 2nd congressional district. He lost to incumbent Edward Voigt. Bolens was a member of the Senate from 1933 to 1940. In 1938, he was a candidate for Governor of Wisconsin, losing to Julius P. Heil. Bolens was also a delegate to the 1944 Democratic National Convention.

References

People from Washington, Iowa
Politicians from Janesville, Wisconsin
People from Port Washington, Wisconsin
Military personnel from Wisconsin
Democratic Party Wisconsin state senators
Mayors of places in Wisconsin
County supervisors in Wisconsin
Wisconsin city council members
1864 births
1944 deaths